Nora Sumberg (born 1956) is an Australian landscape painter whose work has over time become increasingly lyrical, abstract and atmospheric. Her art is characterized by intense, floating swathes of colour, impressionistic and ambiguous terrain and glowing, multi-directional light sources. Examples of Sumberg's art are held in The National Gallery of Victoria, The Queensland Art Gallery, The Heide Museum of Modern Art and the Smorgan Collection. Sumberg is also the granddaughter of Voldemar Sumberg, the Minister for Social Affairs under the Otto Tief Government in Estonia. Estonian culture is important to Sumberg and she has an artist residency in Tallinn in 2011.

Education
Sumberg completed a Diploma in Fine Arts (painting) at Caulfield Institute of Technology, Chisholm (now Monash University) followed by Postgraduate Studies at the New York Studio School, New York, in 1978. She attained Master of Fine Arts at Monash University in 1996.

Formative years
While studying on an Australia Council Scholarship at the New York Studio School, New York, Sumberg stayed in the Hotel Chelsea. During this period Sumberg dressed in punk clothing designed by fashion designer Jenny Bannister. Her teachers at Caulfield Institute of Technology included Australian artist Gareth Sansom, to whom she was married for 10 years. Australian-born singer-songwriter Nick Cave was a fellow student.

Sumberg's early paintings were figurative and somewhat indebted to pop art and the milieu she was part of, with areas of bold, flat colour and schematic, heavily out-lined drawing, done in enamel on Masonite. Australian artist and critic Robert Rooney wrote of these works: "…The best are boldly painted and ambitiously constructed, often with the aid of fish-eye lens distortion…. Surfaces are smooth, with an occasional drip on a tuxedo in 'Dijon Waiter' or a wrinkled skin in 'Model Lisa No. 6.' Flat areas and images are outlined in black."

Maturity

Sumberg's shift into landscape included the introduction of architectural elements and props, frequently depicting expressive, labyrinthine mazes or Italian Villa Garden features such as topiary, gazebos, statues and columns. Sumberg's construction of space was unconventional and complex, with multiple or hidden horizons and the cropping and over-lapping of contradictory, slightly tilted perspectives (often the result of separately painted panels joined together), giving perhaps a subjective account of wandering through the many windings and turnings of such gardens. These works followed a residency at the Australia Council's Besozzo Studio, where Sumberg studied 19thC Italian Villa gardens. These paintings were typically large, multi-panel works. Noted Australian poet and art critic Gary Catalano, wrote: "Too little of the art I see forces my eye to change gear, and I like Sumberg's paintings for just this reason".

Later work saw her largely dispense with the depiction of discrete forms and spatial discontinuities as atmospheric unity and drama assumed a greater importance, particularly the play of light and colouristic intensity. Outlines became less distinct and were subsumed by the overall atmospherics and an increasingly lyrical yet highly considered paint handling. Much of Sumberg's work stems from an emotional, deeply personal response to the Croajingolong National Park, located on the South-East coast of Australia.

Australian artists who have inspired Sumberg include Clarice Beckett and Ken Whisson, the former for her mastery of mood and understatement and the latter for his linear, expressive brushwork. Many recent paintings, such as 'Discombobulation 2', 2004, include abstract elements combined with broadly evoked terrain, foliage and large bodies of water. Poetic and philosophical titles are important to Sumberg. For example: 'Anyone Who Thinks He Understands Nature Should Look Again', 'The Listener', 'Upon a Red Cloud Floating', 'Mostly Awake' and 'Frequencies'.

Jenny Zimmer, reviewing Sumberg's 1990 exhibition 'Purely Painting' at Michael Wardell Gallery, wrote that Sumberg: "transforms sun and cloud and the effects of each on the other into bursts of sensation. Though infused with the nature worship of European romanticism, Sumberg's effects are modern".

Sumberg is currently represented by Jenny Port Gallery in Richmond, Victoria, Australia.

Awards and prizes 
 1978 Visual Arts Board, Australia Council, Peter Brown Memorial Scholarship, New York Studio School, USA
 1982 Visual Arts Board, Australia Council, Besozzo Studio
 1988 Visual Arts Board, Australia Council, Project Grant
 1989 St Kilda City Council Acquisition Drawing Prize, Melbourne
 2000 Artist in Residence, Bundanon, The Arthur & Yvonne Boyd Program for the Arts, Shoalhaven, NSW
 2003 Artist in Residence, The Tower Studio, Victorian Trades Hall Council, Melbourne
 2004 Artist in Residence, St Vincent's Hospital, Melbourne
 2005 Artist in Residence, Queensland College of Art, Griffith University, Brisbane
 2007 Artist in Residence, Red Gate Gallery, Beijing, China

Collections
 National Gallery of Victoria, Melbourne
 Queensland Art Gallery, Brisbane
 Heide Museum of Modern Art
 Museum of Contemporary Art, Sydney
 Monash University
 Smorgan Collection
 Baillieu Myer Collection
 The Arthur and Yvonne Boyd Centre for the Arts
 Artbank, Sydney

References 

 Gerald Vaughan, The Melbourne Times, 21 June 1978
 Robert Rooney, 'Facing the Elements', The Age, 26 Nov 1980
 Jeffrey Makin, 'Alcosser work is impressive', The Sun, 1980
 Alan McCulloch, 'Paintings from the West', The Herald, 20 Nov 1980
 Robert Rooney, The Age, 31 March 1982
 Robert Miller, 'Pussies Galore', The Herald, 25 March 1982
 Jeffrey Makin, 'Look at a Tamed Sunburned Country', The Sun, 31 March 1982
 Robert Miller, 'A Fine Romantic View', The Herald, 28 September 1988
 Jenny Eisen, Visions and Echoes Ita Magazine Issue 20 Nov 1990
 'Nora's Love of Open Spaces', The Launceston Examiner, 13 March 1991
 Neville Drury, 'Images in Contemporary Australian Painting', Craftsman House, Sydney, 1992
 'The Baillieu Myer Collection of the 80s, Vol II', Collections of the Museum of Modern Art at Heide, 1994
 'Style the Buzz', The Australian Magazine, 9-10 Aug 1997
 Phil Brown, 'Dreamland - Nora Sumberg: Poems in Paint', The Brisbane News, issue 411, 28 August 2002
 Robert Nelson, 'Weather Alert', The Age, A3, pg 6, November 2004

External links
 Nora Sumberg at Jenny Port Gallery
 Nora Sumberg: paintings at Red Gallery (Extensive image base).

1956 births
Living people
Artists from Melbourne
Australian contemporary painters
Australian women painters
20th-century Australian women artists
20th-century Australian artists
21st-century Australian women artists
21st-century Australian artists
Monash University alumni
New York Studio School of Drawing, Painting and Sculpture alumni